Satyun (Satyu) is a village of Taranagar tehsil in Churu district in Rajasthan, India.

Location
This is located 48 km north-east of Churu city. It is in south east of Taranagar.

Population
As of the census of 2011, there are 6,457 people. 3,309 of them are male and 3,147 are female.

References

Villages in Churu district